The Australia Cup was a women's international soccer tournament hosted annually in Australia between 1999 and 2004.

1999 Tournament

Results

Pool stage

Classification matches

Third-place match

Final

2000 Tournament

Results

Pool

2001

2002

2003

match abandoned after 77' (with result standing) following an incident between a Korean official and an assistant referee

2004

match abandoned at half time due to adverse weather (and 0–0 result declared), despite North Korea having scored – Sok Chun Myong

References

International women's association football competitions hosted by Australia
1998–99 in Australian women's soccer
1999–2000 in Australian women's soccer
2000–01 in Australian women's soccer
2001–02 in Australian women's soccer
2002–03 in Australian women's soccer
2003–04 in Australian women's soccer
1999 in women's association football
2000 in women's association football
2001 in women's association football
2002 in women's association football
2003 in women's association football
2004 in women's association football
Recurring sporting events established in 1999
Recurring sporting events disestablished in 2004
1999 establishments in Australia
2004 disestablishments in Australia